Anton Wolf (21 April 1933 – 22 September 2010) was an Austrian footballer. He competed in the men's tournament at the 1952 Summer Olympics.

References

External links
 
 

1933 births
2010 deaths
Austrian footballers
Austria international footballers
Olympic footballers of Austria
Footballers at the 1952 Summer Olympics
Place of birth missing
Association football midfielders
SK Sturm Graz players